Cindy Ziemke is a member of the Indiana House of Representatives, representing the 55th District. She is a Republican who was first elected to the House in 2012. She retired from political life in 2022.

Committee assignments
Family, Children and Human Affairs (Vice Chair)
Commerce, Small Business and Economic Development
Select Committee on Government Reduction

References

External links 
Cindy Meyer Ziemke at ballotpedia.org
Cindy Ziemke at votesmart.org

Living people
Republican Party members of the Indiana House of Representatives
Year of birth missing (living people)
Women state legislators in Indiana
21st-century American politicians
21st-century American women politicians